Yannick Osée (born 13 June 1997) is a German professional footballer who plays as a defender for SV Meppen.

References

Living people
1997 births
German footballers
Association football defenders
3. Liga players
Regionalliga players
1. FC Kaiserslautern players
FK Pirmasens players
SV Meppen players